Helen Jacobsohn (born 17 June 1945 in Brisbane, Queensland) is an Australian sprint canoeist who competed in the mid-1970s. She was eliminated in the repechages of K-2 500 m event the 1976 Summer Olympics in Montreal.

References
 

1945 births
Australian female canoeists
Canoeists at the 1976 Summer Olympics
Living people
Olympic canoeists of Australia
Sportswomen from Queensland
Sportspeople from Brisbane